Woodwren or wood-wren may refer to:-

Birds
wrens in the genus Henicorhina

Ships
 , a British coaster in service 1947-53